Xylopertha is a genus of beetle found in Europe, the Near East and North Africa.

References

External links 
 Xylopertha at Fauna Europaea
 

Woodboring beetles
Bostrichidae
Taxa named by Félix Édouard Guérin-Méneville
Bostrichiformia genera